This is a list of public art in Falkirk, Scotland, and includes works in the Falkirk council area. This list applies only to works of public art on permanent display in an outdoor public space and does not, for example, include artworks in museums.

Airth

Avonbridge

Blackness

Bo'ness

Falkirk

Grangemouth

Larbert

Laurieston

Longcroft

Slamannan

References

Falkirk
Outdoor sculptures in Scotland
Statues in Scotland